Five ships and a shore establishment of the Royal Navy have been named HMS Mersey after the River Mersey:

Ships
 was a  26-gun sixth rate launched in 1814, used for harbour service from 1832, and broken up in 1852.
 was a wooden screw frigate launched in 1858 and sold in 1875.
 was a  protected cruiser launched in 1885 and sold in 1905.
 was a  monitor launched in 1913 for Brazil, but purchased by the Royal Navy in 1914 and sold in 1921.

Shore establishments

Tenders
HMS Mersey was the name borne by a number of tenders to the Mersey Division Royal Naval Reserve
HM Motor minesweeper 1075 was HMS Mersey between 1949 and 1956.
Two Ton-class minesweepers bearing the name HMS Mersey served as tenders to the Mersey Division RNR.
 HMS Amerton M1105 was HMS Mersey between 1954 and 1959.
 HMS Pollington M1173 was HMS Mersey between 1959 and 1975.

Battle honours
Belgian Coast, 1914–15
Königsberg, 1915

Royal Navy ship names